

Plesiosaurs

New taxa

Synapsids

Non-mammalian

Mammals

References

1840s in paleontology
Paleontology